Josef Čipera (born 12 January 1888, date of death unknown) was a Bohemian fencer. He competed for Bohemia in the team sabre event at the 1912 Summer Olympics.

References

External links
 
 

1888 births
Year of death unknown
People from Rakovník
People from the Kingdom of Bohemia
Czech male fencers
Olympic fencers of Bohemia
Fencers at the 1912 Summer Olympics
Sportspeople from the Central Bohemian Region